Fighting Squadron 10 (VF-10), also known as the "Grim Reapers", was an aviation unit of the United States Navy, established on 3 June 1942 and disestablished on 26 November 1945.

Operational history
VF-10 was established at NAS San Diego flying the Grumman F4F Wildcat. The first commanding officer was James H. Flatley fresh from the Battle of the Coral Sea. As part of that campaign, the Grim Reapers played a pivotal role in defending the Enterprise and its task force during the Battle of Santa Cruz Islands from 25-27 October 1942.

After their return to the U.S. and NAS Sand Point they transitioned to the Grumman F6F-3 Hellcat and once again deployed to the South Pacific aboard Enterprise. During their second combat tour, VF-10 participated in operations in the Marshall Islands, Jaluit, Emirau, Western Caroline Islands, Hollandia, Truk Lagoon and the Battle of the Philippine Sea (Marianas Turkey Shoot).

The squadron returned to the States, transitioning to the Vought F4U Corsair in January 1945 at NAS Atlantic City.  VF-10 returned to the Pacific aboard  and took part in strikes against Ryukyu Islands, Kyūshū, Okinawa and the Wake Island. Finally, VF-10 returned to NAS Alameda where it was deactivated in November 1945.

See also
 Edward L. Feightner
 Donald "Flash" Gordon
 History of the United States Navy
 Macgregor Kilpatrick
 William H. Leder
 List of inactive United States Navy aircraft squadrons
 List of United States Navy aircraft squadrons
 Swede Vejtasa

References

External references

Strike fighter squadrons of the United States Navy